Sukradasa is a 1977 Indian Malayalam film, directed by Anthikkad Mani. The film stars Jayabharathi, Adoor Bhasi, Jose Prakash and Sreelatha Namboothiri in the lead roles. The film has musical score by M. K. Arjunan.

Cast
Jayabharathi 
Jayan 
Adoor Bhasi 
Jose Prakash 
Sreelatha Namboothiri 
Raghavan 
Paul Vengola

Soundtrack
The music was composed by M. K. Arjunan and the lyrics were written by Mankombu Gopalakrishnan.

References

External links
 

1977 films
1970s Malayalam-language films